Mahara or Mahra is a Chhetri and Pahadi Rajput surname from Nepal and Uttarakhand. In Kali Kumaon, the Mahra(Mahara) and Phartyals were the most famous 'dharras'/(धड़ा) in the recorded history of Kumaon.

Notable people with the surname include:
Kalu Singh Mahara, Indian Kumaoni freedom fighter
Karan Mahara (born 1972), Indian politician
Krishna Bahadur Mahara (born 1958), Nepalese politician and minister 
Mahendra Singh Mahra, Indian politician and MP of Rajya Sabha for Uttarakhand. 
Ummed Singh Mahra (21 January 1942 – 6 July 1971), Indian Kumaoni posthumous recipient of the Ashoka Chakra.

Ethnic groups in Nepal
Ethnic groups in India
Nepali-language surnames
Khas surnames